Ecological sustainability is part of the values in the Ministry of Education curriculum.

The 2009 Government Budget removed funding for Education for Sustainability, effective from December.

By 2018 1,161 schools used Enviroschools, founded by Te Mauri Tau in the late 1990s, with funding from the Ministry for the Environment and regional councils. Enviroschools take part in activities such as tree planting, recycling, sustainable transport.

See also
Education in New Zealand
Environment of New Zealand
Conservation in New Zealand

References

External links
New Zealand Association for Environmental Education
 Enviroschools/Kura Taiao
Environmental Education Ltd

Environment of New Zealand
Education in New Zealand
Environmental education